The third season of the military science fiction television series Stargate SG-1 commenced airing on Showtime in the United States on June 25, 1999, concluded on Sky1 in the United Kingdom on March 8, 2000, and contained 22 episodes. The third season follows SG-1 in their fight against the Goa'uld Empire's System Lords, the main being Sokar until "The Devil You Know" and then Apophis, after he regained power during that episode. The season introduces the long-unseen and unnamed enemy of the Asgards, the Replicators, who are self-replicating machines that seek to convert all civilizations into more of themselves, thus posing a dire threat to all other beings. The Replicators are first mentioned, but not named, in season three episode "Fair Game".

The one-hour premiere "Into the Fire", which debuted on June 25, 1999, on Showtime did not receive any syndication rating, but overall got a high viewership level. The series was developed by Brad Wright and Jonathan Glassner, who also served as executive producers. Season 3 regular cast members include Richard Dean Anderson, Michael Shanks, Amanda Tapping, Christopher Judge, and Don S. Davis.

Production
"Deadman Switch" is the first episode in which the Stargate is not seen. "Demons" was Carl Binder's first and only contribution to Stargate SG-1. He would later become a staff writer on the spin-off series Stargate Atlantis.

The urban outdoor scenes of Tollana in "Pretense" were shot on the main campus of Simon Fraser University (S.F.U.) in Burnaby, a small city just east of Vancouver.

Actor Dom DeLuise, who played Urgo and Togar in "Urgo", is the father of director Peter DeLuise, and Urgo's transformation into an Air Force officer was played by Peter. "Urgo" marked the first time a DeLuise guest-starred on the show. Dom's sons Peter, Michael, and David, Dom's daughter-in-law and Peter's wife, Anne Marie, had on-screen roles in later seasons. Dom DeLuise ad-libbed most of his lines. According to the Official Guide to Seasons Three and Four, very few scenes include Teal'c, since actor Christopher Judge could not keep a straight face.

Jackson's appendicitis in "Nemesis" reflected Michael Shanks' real-world condition; it was written into the script at the last minute because the writers needed to drastically reduce Shanks' role to allow for his recovery.  Shanks' scenes in the episode were actually shot a week after filming of the episode was completed.

When Seth is killed in "Seth", Jack O'Neill's "Hail Dorothy" is a reference to The Wizard of Oz.

Reception
"Into The Fire" was nominated for a Leo Award in the category "Best Cinematography in a Dramatic Series". For "Point of View", Amanda Tapping was nominated for a Leo Award in the category "Best Performance by a Female in a Dramatic Series". For "Forever in a Day", Michael Shanks was nominated for a Leo Award in the category "Best Performance by a male in a Dramatic Series". "The Devil You Know" was nominated for a Leo Award in the category "Best Production Design in a Dramatic Series". For "A Hundred Days", Brad Wright and Victoria James were nominated for a Leo Award in the category "Best Screenwriter of a Dramatic Series". "Nemesis" was nominated for an Emmy in the category "Outstanding Special Visual Effects for a Series", and won a Leo Award in the category "Best Overall Sound in a Dramatic Series".

Main cast
 Starring Richard Dean Anderson as Colonel Jack O'Neill
 Michael Shanks as Dr. Daniel Jackson
 Amanda Tapping as Captain/Major Samantha Carter
 With Christopher Judge as Teal'c
 And Don S. Davis as Major General George Hammond

Episodes

Episodes in bold are continuous episodes, where the story spans over 2 or more episodes.

Home releases

References

External links

 Season 3  on GateWorld
 Season 3 on IMDb
 Season 3  on TV.com
 

 03
1999 Canadian television seasons
2000 American television seasons
SG-1 03
1999 American television seasons
2000 Canadian television seasons